Unguitrema nigrum, also known as the Black crinoid clingfish is a species of clingfish endemic to Papua New Guinea. This species occurs Madang Lagoon in Madang District, Madang Province, Papua New Guinea. This species is the only known member of its genus. It was collected from a crinoid, Oxycomanthus bennetti, of the black phase.

References

Gobiesocidae
Fish described in 2014